Arabygdi is a village in Vinje Municipality in Vestfold og Telemark county, Norway. The village is located in the Rauland area at the western end of the lake Totak. The Norwegian County Road 362 passes through the village, connecting it to the villages of Haukeli (to the west) and Raulandsgrend (to the east). The road passes through the Urdbøuri scree area, just west of Arabygdi.

Arabygdi is particularly known for the 19th-century folk musician Targjei Augundsson, who was better known by his stage name, Myllarguten. His home Myllarheimen has been preserved as a museum.

References

Vinje
Villages in Vestfold og Telemark